Pleasant Dale is an unincorporated community in Hampshire County in the U.S. state of West Virginia. Pleasant Dale is located between Capon Bridge and Augusta on the Northwestern Turnpike (U.S. Route 50). Tearcoat Creek flows through Pleasant Dale and offers whitewater rafting in the Spring from the U.S. Route 50 bridge to its confluence with the North River.

The community was named for a scenic dale near the town site.

References 

Unincorporated communities in Hampshire County, West Virginia
Unincorporated communities in West Virginia
Northwestern Turnpike